Olivier Sukiennicki (born 25 May 2003) is a Polish professional footballer who plays as a midfielder.

Club career
Sukiennicki began his career in his native Poland with hometown clubs Ajaks Częstochowa and Raków Częstochowa. He moved to England with his family in 2015, playing youth football for West Bromwich Albion, Manchester City, Stoke City and Bradford City.

He made his senior debut for Bradford City on 10 November 2020, alongside fellow youth team player Charlie Wood, appearing as an 80th minute substitute in the EFL Trophy in a 3–1 home defeat against Oldham Athletic.

In February 2021 he was named in the League Football Education's 'The 11' list, which recognises both football and non-footballing activities of young players.

In August 2021 he signed a one-year professional contract with Bradford City. He was released by the club at the end of the season.

International career
In May 2021 he was called up to a training camp organised by the Poland under-19 national team. He played for the under-19s in September 2021.

References

2003 births
Living people
Polish footballers
Poland youth international footballers
Raków Częstochowa players
West Bromwich Albion F.C. players
Manchester City F.C. players
Stoke City F.C. players
Bradford City A.F.C. players
Association football midfielders
Polish expatriate footballers
Polish expatriates in England
Expatriate footballers in England